Lutfullah , meaning Kindness of God, is a masculine Muslim name. Of Arabic origin as well as Persian hybridization & distribution. Most commonly occurring in Iranic & Turkic countries. Variant transliterations are Lutf Allah, Lütfullah , Lotfollah, Lutfallah.

Historical
Lutf Allah (Sarbadar) (died c. 1357/58) leader of the Sarbadars of Sabzewar
Lutfullah Halimi (died 1516), Ottoman poet and lexicographer
Lutfullah Khan Shirazi, Mughal faujdar of Kamrup and Sylhet
Lutfullah Tabrizi, Naib Nazim of Jahangirnagar, and later Orissa

Modern

Given Name
Lutfullah Khan (1916–2012), Pakistani author, Collector & Archivist
Lotfollah Safi Golpaygani (1919-2022), Iranian Twelver Shia Marja
Lotfollah Yarmohammadi (born 1933), Iranian Linguist & Professor
Lotfollah Meisami (born 1942), Iranian Politician
 (born 1943), Iranian Politician
Lütfullah Kayalar (born 1952), Turkish Lawyer & Politician
 (born 1961), Iranian Politician
Lotfollah Forouzandeh (born 1961), Iranian Politician
Lotfollah Dezhkam (born 1962), Iranian Cleric & Politician
 (born 1964), Iranian Historian
Lutfullah Mashal (born 1971), Afghan Politician & Writer
Lutfullah Khairkhwa, Afghan Politician
 (born 1987), Afghan Journalist
Lutfulla Turaev (born 1988), Uzbek footballer

Middle Name
Kaveh L. Afrasiabi (born 1958), Iranian-American Political Scientist

Surname
 (born 1936), Bahraini Businessman & Philanthropist
Mustafa Lutfullah (born 1961), Bengali Politician
Hurshil Lutfullaev (born 1983), Kyrgyz footballer
Sharafuddin Lutfillaev (born 1990), Uzbek Martial Artist
 (born 1992), Bahraini Football Player

Places
Lütfullah Aksungur Sports Hall, Adana, Turkey
Sheikh Lotfollah Mosque, Isfahan, Iran
Darageh-ye Lotfollah, village in West Azerbaijan Province, Iran
Qaralar-e Lotfollah, village in West Azerbaijan Province, Iran. 
Mir Lotfollah, village in Isfahan Province, Iran

See Also
 List of Arabic theophoric names

Arabic masculine given names